Behnam Malakooti , is Professor of Systems Engineering of Department of Electrical Engineering and Computer Science at the Case Western Reserve University (CWRU), OH, USA. He has been affiliated with CWRU since 1982. He is a pioneer researcher in risk, Operations Management, Manufacturing Systems, multiple criteria optimization.
He developed artificial neural networks for predicting decision-making behavior for out-of-sample data. He also pioneered the theory of multiple-objective optimization for solving decision making, operations and manufacturing systems, machinability  of materials, Artificial Neural Networks,  facility layout, and group technology and clustering.

Education
Ph.D. in Industrial Engineering (1982), Purdue University
MS in Industrial Engineering (1979), Purdue University
MS in Economics (1978), Purdue University

Honor and awards 
Malakooti has received several awards including
 Fellow, Institute of Industrial & Systems Engineers (IISE); one of twelve recipients, 1997.
 Fellow, Society of Manufacturing Engineers (SME), one of ten international recipients, 1996
 Fellow, Institute of Electrical and Electronics Engineers (IEEE), since 1998 .
 Divisional Professional Leadership Award, one of three national recipients, IEEE, 2000-2001 .
 Exceptional Research Achievement, Department of Electrical Engineering & Computer Science, Case Western Reserve University, 2004 .

Selected publications
 Malakooti, B, "Operations and production systems with multiple objectives"   John Wiley & Sons, 2013
 Malakooti, B. "Decision Making Process: Typology, Intelligence, and Optimization" Journal of Intelligent Manufacturing , DOI: 10.1007/s10845-010-0424-1, Volume 23, Issue 3 (2012), Page 733-746.
 Brian J. Barritt, Shaya Sheikh, Camelia Al-Najjar- Behnam Malakooti, “Mobile Ad-Hoc Network Broadcasting: A Multi-Criteria Approach”, International Journal of Communication Systems, DOI: 10.1002/dac.1162,2010, Volume 24, Issue 4 (2011), Page 438-460.
 Malakooti, B., Y. Zhou, "An Adaptive Feedforward Artificial Neural Network with Application to Multiple Criteria Decision Making," Management Science, Vol. 40,11, Nov. 1994, pp. 1542–1561.
 Malakooti, B. "Ranking and Screening Multiple Criteria Alternatives with Partial Information and use of Ordinal and Cardinal Strength of Preferences", IEEE Transactions on Systems, Man, and Cybernetics Part A, Vol. 30, 3, 355-369, 2000.
 Malakooti, B., "Multi-Objective Facility Layout: A Heuristic Method to Generate All Efficient Alternatives," International Journal of Production Research, Vol. 27, No. 7, 1989, pp. 1225–1238.
 Malakooti, B., J. Deviprasad, "An Interactive Multiple Criteria Approach for Parameter Selection in Metal Cutting,"  Operations Research, Vol. 37, No. 5, Sept.-Oct. 1989, pp. 805–8l8.
 Malakooti, B., A. Tsurushima, "An Expert System Using Priorities for Solving Multiple Criteria Facility Layout Problems," International Journal of Production Research Vol. 27, No. 5, 1989, pp. 793–808.
 Malakooti, Behnam, and Ying Q. Zhou. "Feedforward artificial neural networks for solving discrete multiple criteria decision making problems." Management Science 40.11 (1994): 1542-1561.
 Malakooti, B., and G. I. D'souza. "Multiple objective programming for the quadratic assignment problem." International Journal of Production Research 25.2 (1987): 285-300.
 Malakooti, Behnam. "A multiple criteria decision making approach for the assembly line balancing problem." International Journal of Production Research 29.10 (1991): 1979-2001.
 Malakooti, B. B. "Assembly line balancing with buffers by multiple criteria optimization." International Journal of Production Research 32.9 (1994): 2159-2178.
 Malakooti, B. (1989). Multiple objective facility layout: a heuristic to generate efficient alternatives. International Journal of Production Research, 27(7), 1225-1238.
 Malakooti, Behnam. "A decision support system and a heuristic interactive approach for solving discrete multiple criteria problems." IEEE Transactions on Systems, Man, and Cybernetics 18.2 (1988): 273-284.
 Malakooti, B., and Akira Tsurushima. "An expert system using priorities for solving multiple-criteria facility layout problems." International Journal of Production Research 27.5 (1989): 793-808.

References

Year of birth missing (living people)
Living people
Case Western Reserve University faculty
Purdue University College of Engineering alumni
21st-century American engineers